The 2002 Bulgarian Cup Final was played at the Stadion Slavia in Sofia on 15 May 2002 and was contested between the sides of CSKA Sofia and Levski Sofia. The match was won by Levski Sofia.

Match

Details

See also
2001–02 A Group

References

Bulgarian Cup finals
Cup Final
PFC Levski Sofia matches
PFC CSKA Sofia matches